Quedius cinctus is a species of large rove beetle in the family Staphylinidae.

References

 Brunke A, Marshall S (2011). "Contributions to the faunistics and bionomics of Staphylinidae (Coleoptera) in northeastern North America: discoveries made through study of the University of Guelph Insect Collection, Ontario, Canada". ZooKeys 75: 29–68.
 Klimaszewski J, McLean J, Chandler D, Savard K, Li A (2009). "Survey of rove beetles (Coleoptera, Staphylinidae) from Stanley Park, Vancouver, British Columbia, Canada, with new records and description of a new species. Part 2". ZooKeys 22: 19–33.
 Klimaszewski J, McLean J, Li A, Savard K (2009). "Survey of rove beetles (Coleoptera, Staphylinidae) from Stanley Park, Vancouver, British Columbia, Canada, with new records and description of a new species. Part 1". ZooKeys 22: 5–17.
 Klimaszewski J, Webster R, Savard K (2009). "Review of the rove beetle species of the subtribe Gyrophaenina Kraatz (Coleoptera, Staphylinidae) from New Brunswick, Canada: new species, provincial records and bionomic information". ZooKeys 22: 81–170.

Further reading

 Arnett, R.H. Jr., M. C. Thomas, P. E. Skelley and J. H. Frank. (eds.). (2002). American Beetles, Volume II: Polyphaga: Scarabaeoidea through Curculionoidea. CRC Press LLC, Boca Raton, FL.
 Arnett, Ross H. (2000). American Insects: A Handbook of the Insects of America North of Mexico. CRC Press.
 Richard E. White. (1983). Peterson Field Guides: Beetles. Houghton Mifflin Company.

Staphylininae
Beetles described in 1790